"Brother from the Same Planet" is the fourteenth episode of the fourth season of the American animated television series The Simpsons. It first aired on the Fox network in the United States on February 4, 1993. In the episode, after Homer is late to pick him up from soccer practice, Bart turns to the program the Bigger Brothers, and is assigned a man named Tom. Out of jealousy, Homer gets himself a little brother named Pepi. Meanwhile, Lisa becomes addicted to the Corey hotline, a phone service where television fans can listen to the voice of a fictional actor based on Corey Feldman and Corey Haim.

The episode was written by Jon Vitti and directed by Jeffrey Lynch. The producers tried to cast Tom Cruise for the role of Tom, but Cruise refused and they chose Phil Hartman instead. "Brother from the Same Planet" received favorable reception in books and in the media, and was highlighted among the five best episodes of the series by the writers of the Fox series King of the Hill.

Plot
After soccer practice, Bart waits for Homer to pick him up, but his father has forgotten. When Homer finally remembers, he reasons to an angered Bart that they should just both admit they are wrong and try to put the issue behind them. Later, Bart views a commercial for a mentor program called The Bigger Brothers, which pairs up fatherless boys with positive male role models. Still angry at Homer, Bart goes to the agency pretending to be a young boy whose father was a drunken gambler who abandoned him. The receptionist pairs him up with their best Bigger Brother, a military test pilot named Tom. The two spend time together doing a variety of activities, though Bart feels guilty over taking up Tom's time despite not actually being fatherless. Homer finds out about Tom and confronts Bart. Homer decides to go to the Bigger Brothers Agency to get revenge by being assigned with a replacement son; a young, poor boy named Pepi.

Later on, it is Bigger Brothers Day in Marine World, where the Bigger Brothers and their boys attend to celebrate (including Homer, Tom, Bart, and Pepi). After running into Homer and learning how bad of a father he is from Bart, Tom brawls with him. The fight rages across Springfield and ends with Homer's defeat, his back draped painfully over a fire hydrant. Homer is sent to a hospital on a stretcher, with Bart blaming himself. Tom laments how he will miss being a Bigger Brother, while Pepi is sad over losing his Bigger Brother. Bart suggests Tom become Pepi's big brother; they happily agree and walk into the sunset holding hands. Homer (whose back is now fixed) and Bart reconcile, as Homer teaches Bart how to brawl due to his experience with Tom.

Meanwhile, Marge finds an anomalously high phone bill for calls made by Lisa to the Corey hotline — a premium rate phone service where fans can listen to the voice of a teen heartthrob. Lisa promises to stop increasing the family's phone bill, but continues to make calls to the hotline from Dr. Hibbert's office and a telephone at Springfield Elementary. After Principal Skinner catches her, Marge suggests that Lisa try to go until midnight without calling the hotline; if she can do so, she will have conquered her addiction. Although tempted throughout the rest of the day, Lisa beats her addiction.

Production

"Brother from the Same Planet" was written by Jon Vitti and directed by Jeffrey Lynch. It originally aired in the United States on February 4, 1993, on Fox. The writers wrote the role of Tom for actor Tom Cruise. However, when offered the part, Cruise repeatedly turned it down, so the producers used Phil Hartman instead. The writers based the Corey character on the actors Corey Feldman and Corey Haim, known as The Two Coreys. Pepi was based on the fictional character Dondi from the daily comic strip of the same name.

In the episode, Bart and Tom watch The Ren & Stimpy Show. The producers contacted Nickelodeon to get authorization to use the two characters for that sequence. Nickelodeon was strict about what The Simpsons was allowed to do, and the producers were not allowed to have the savageness that they wanted. The Ren & Stimpy Show's animators offered to do the layouts of Ren and Stimpy for the episode.

The television show Bart watches, Tuesday Night Live, is a parody of NBC's Saturday Night Live. Krusty appears in a sketch called "The Big Ear Family", and says that the sketch goes on for twelve more minutes, even though the joke's punchline has already been established. That was Vitti's way of criticizing Saturday Night Live for having overlong sketches with thin joke premises. The sequence originally had a longer version of the Tuesday Night Live band playing into the commercial break, but it was cut because Vitti, who was a writer on Saturday Night Live during the 1985–86 season along with fellow The Simpsons writers, George Meyer and John Swartzwelder, did not want to come off as being bitter.

The writing staff was looking for a way to end the episode, and executive producer Sam Simon suggested that they watch the film The Quiet Man. The writers came in on a Saturday to watch the film together. They were inspired by the film's fight scene between John Wayne and Victor McLaglen's characters to do a fight scene between Homer and Tom in the episode. The scene was difficult for the producers to sound-mix because they wanted it to be funny but not horrifying. They discovered that the more realistic the effects used sounded, the funnier the scene became. The producers tried all sorts of different sounds for when Homer cracks his back on the fire hydrant and chose the tiniest realistic sound, because they believed that it was the most painful and "hilarious".

Cultural references

The title of the episode is a reference to the 1984 film The Brother from Another Planet. The scene in which Milhouse writes "Trab pu kcip! "Trab pu kcip!" on the wall is a reference to "red rum" from Stanley Kubrick's 1980 film The Shining. The woman Bart mistakes for Homer is singing the Helen Reddy song "I Am Woman". While Bart is stuck in the storm waiting for Homer, a nun is lifted by the wind, a reference to the TV series The Flying Nun, and explodes. Bart and Tom watch The Ren & Stimpy Show. Homer watches an NFL Films production about Bart Starr, the quarterback on the Green Bay Packers who led the team to victory in the first two Super Bowls.

The scene where Homer accuses Bart of seeing his big brother is a reference to the 1966 film Who's Afraid of Virginia Woolf?, where Richard Burton accuses Elizabeth Taylor of adultery. In a made-up story Homer tells Pepi, Bart tells Homer to shut up and shoves half a grapefruit in his face, a reference to the 1931 film The Public Enemy. Bart watches Tuesday Night Live, a parody of NBC's Saturday Night Live. During the fight scene between Homer and Tom, the background music is a knockoff of the music used in the fight scene in The Quiet Man, and the fighting pose Tom makes is a parody of the Street Fighter II introduction sequence. Skinner's disturbing monologue about his mother watching him is a parody of Norman Bates' similar dialogue from the 1960 Hitchcock film Psycho.

Reception
In its original broadcast, "Brother from the Same Planet" finished 18th in ratings for the week of February 1–7, 1993, with a Nielsen rating of 14.9, equivalent to approximately 13.9 million viewing households. It was the highest-rated show on the Fox network that week, beating Martin.

In their section on the episode in the book I Can't Believe It's a Bigger and Better Updated Unofficial Simpsons Guide, Warren Martyn and Adrian Wood comment: "We love Homer sitting at home trying to remember to pick up Bart—he's watching a TV show about a football star called Bart, with pictures of Bart on all sides, and even Maggie seems to be calling her brother's name."  Writing in the compilation work The Psychology of The Simpsons, Robert M. Arkin and Philip J. Mazzocco reference a scene from the episode where Homer "argues with his own brain about a desired course of action" to illustrate self-discrepancy theory, the idea that "humans will go to great lengths to attain and preserve self-esteem".

The writers of the FOX program King of the Hill put "Brother from the Same Planet" among the five best episodes of The Simpsons, including "Homer the Heretic", "Lisa's Wedding", "Lisa's Substitute", and "Behind the Laughter". Mikey Cahill of the Herald Sun highlighted the quote "PickupBart? What the hell is PickupBart?" by Homer in his list of "Fab Fives" related to The Simpsons. When asked to pick his favorite season out of The Simpsons seasons one through twenty, Paul Lane of the Niagara Gazette picked season four and highlighted "Brother from the Same Planet" and "Mr. Plow" which he called "excellent", along with "the sweetly funny" "Lisa's First Word", and "Homer the Heretic". In a review of The Simpsons season four, Lyndsey Shinoda of Video Store cited "Brother from the Same Planet" and "I Love Lisa" among her "personal favorites" from the season.

References

Further reading

External links

The Simpsons (season 4) episodes
1993 American television episodes
Works about addiction
The Ren & Stimpy Show